Villabon is a commune in the Cher department in the Centre-Val de Loire region of France.

Geography

Population

Sights
 The church dating from the nineteenth century.
 A watermill.
 The sixteenth-century chateau of Savoye.

See also
Communes of the Cher department

References

Communes of Cher (department)